Albert John Dunn (27 November 1941 – 21 August 2009) was an Australian rules footballer who played for South Melbourne in the Victorian Football League (VFL) during the 1960s.

Dunn was a local player at South Melbourne Districts when recruited into the South Melbourne team.

After sporadic appearances in the seniors over three seasons, Dunn went and played with Corowa and won the Ovens and Murray Football League's best and fairest award, the Morris Medal in 1965, before returning to South Melbourne to play in 1966.

He finished his career at Launceston and took home the Hec Smith Memorial Medal in 1968, as the 'best and fairest' player in the Northern Tasmanian Football Association. The following season, Dunn represented Tasmania in the Adelaide Carnival.

References

Holmesby, Russell and Main, Jim (2007). The Encyclopedia of AFL Footballers. 7th ed. Melbourne: Bas Publishing.

External links

1941 births
2009 deaths
Sydney Swans players
Launceston Football Club players
Corowa Football Club players
Australian rules footballers from Victoria (Australia)